Milan Maričić (born 12 October 1961) is a Croatian football manager and former player.

Club career
Born in Vinkovci, SR Croatia, back then within Yugoslavia, Maričić played for over a decade with NK Osijek in the Yugoslav First League.  He Osijek's captain during the last five seasons, and in 1991 he moved to Belgrade and signed with Serbian club FK Rad. He played with Rad in the 1991–92 Yugoslav First League. Then he moved to Greece where he played four years with Panachaiki F.C. in Superleague Greece and then retired and became assistant manager in same club. He then by summer 2002 was working as coach of the youth teams of Patraikos.

Personal life
His wife, Slobodanka "Boba" Čolović was an athlete and they have lived for ten years on the Greek island of Corfu.

References

1961 births
Living people
Sportspeople from Vinkovci
Serbs of Croatia
Association football defenders
Yugoslav footballers
Croatian footballers
NK Osijek players
FK Rad players
Panachaiki F.C. players
Yugoslav First League players
Super League Greece players
Croatian expatriate footballers
Expatriate footballers in Greece
Croatian expatriate sportspeople in Greece
Croatian football managers
Croatian expatriate football managers
Expatriate football managers in Greece